Let's Side is a four track EP released by American rap group The Click. It was released by Sick Wid It Records in 1990 on LP and cassette.

Track listing

"Let's Side" - 4:52	
"Face the Facts" - 3:49
"Don't Stop the Music" - 4:12	
"The Shit (That Will Drive You Insain)" - 5:05

External links
 Let's Side (cassette) at Discogs	
 Let's Side (LP) at Discogs	
 Let's Side (LP) at MusicBrainz	

1990 debut EPs
E-40 albums
B-Legit albums
Suga-T albums
Self-released EPs
West Coast hip hop EPs
Sick Wid It Records EPs